Auguste Nourrit (1808-1853) was a 19th-century French tenor and opera director, younger brother of famous Adolphe Nourrit and son of tenor Louis Nourrit.

Life 
Auguste Nourrit made his debut at the Opéra-Comique of Paris in 1826 and stayed there a few years before moving to the Hague in 1833 in order to head the Théâtre français.

After a brief stint at the Comédie-Française, he directed the Theatre of Antwerp in 1836–1837. In the early 1840s, he made a long tour of the United States and Canada: he sang especially in New Orleans, New York, then in Montreal, Quebec City and Toronto.

In 1847, he was appointed director of the Théâtre de la Monnaie in Brussels but had to give up in November, due to financial meltdown.

External links 
 Almanach des spectacles
 Strong on Music: The New York Music Scene in the Days of George Templeton

1808 births
1853 deaths
French operatic tenors
French opera directors
French theatre managers and producers
Troupe of the Comédie-Française
19th-century French male opera singers
French expatriates in the Netherlands
French expatriates in Belgium